Yarranlea Primary School is an independent co-educational primary school located in the Mount Gravatt campus of Griffith University in Mount Gravatt, Queensland, Australia.

History
The school opened on the 22nd of January 1883 in Yarranlea, Queensland as Hermitage Provisional School. The school building which is still in use at the schools current Mount Gravatt, Queensland location was constructed on the Yarranlea site in 1888. This school building is heritage listed by Brisbane City Council.

In 1901 the school was changed to a State School and thus was renamed Yarranlea State School. Due to falling attendance Yarranlea State School closed was in 1977.

In 1979 the school building was relocated to from its Yarranlea location to the Mount Gravatt College of Advanced Education (now Griffith University Mount Gravatt campus) which is located in Mount Gravatt, Queensland, Australia. The school building was used as a museum display school.

In 1987 the school building was again relocated a short distance within the Griffith University Mount Gravatt campus. On the 27th of January 1987 the school reopened as Old Yarranlea State School.

In December 2013, the school was once again closed by Education Queensland as part of a broader schools cost-cutting program by the Liberal National Party of Queensland who was the political party in charge of the Queensland Government at the time.

The school was reopened as an independent school in July 2014 as Yarranlea Primary School.

References 

Private primary schools in Queensland
Griffith University